is a 1987 Japanese documentary film by director Kazuo Hara. The documentary centers on Kenzō Okuzaki, a 62-year-old veteran of Japan's campaign in New Guinea in the Second World War, and follows him around as he searches out those responsible for the unexplained deaths of two soldiers in his old unit.

Documentary filmmaker Errol Morris listed The Emperor's Naked Army Marches On as one of his Top 5 Favorite Films for Rotten Tomatoes.

Summary
Okuzaki ultimately holds Emperor Shōwa accountable for all the suffering of the war ("I hate irresponsible people...the most cowardly man in Japan, is the Emperor"). During his protests, he slanders police as "robots". He painstakingly tracks down former soldiers and officers, coaxing them into telling him about the deaths, often abusing them verbally and at times physically in the process and causing one to bleed (at one point, Okuzaki states that "violence is my forte"). The people he talks to give different accounts of what transpired almost 40 years earlier, some saying that those killed were executed for desertion after the war was already over, while others state that they were shot for cannibalizing New Guinea indigenous people.

At the end of the war, the Japanese garrison in New Guinea was crammed into a small area and almost completely cut off from food supplies, leading to starvation and according to some of the interviewed, also to cannibalism. According to them, indigenous people were euphemistically called "black pigs" while Allied soldiers were "white pigs" - although one of the interviewed says there was a ban on eating "white pigs". The sister of one of the executed at one point states her belief that the two (low-ranking privates) were killed so that the officers would have something to eat.

During the course of Okuzaki's investigation a captain named Koshimizu is said to have issued the order to execute the pair, with a couple of the interviewed also stating that he personally finished them off with his pistol after the firing squad failed to kill them outright, something the captain denies.

Okuzaki also discovers that there has been another suspicious death in his unit and seeks out a former sergeant who is the sole survivor of his regiment. After much coaxing and a physical altercation the sergeant tells him that he personally killed a fellow soldier who had been stealing food and that the corpse was then eaten. He also states that the indigenous were not cannibalized as they were too quick to catch. Instead, Japanese soldiers were marked for death and cannibalized ("the immoral and selfish ones" first). The sergeant states that he only survived because he could make himself useful as a jungle guide, for instance finding fresh water for the other soldiers.

A written panel then states that the documentary crew and Okuzaki traveled to New Guinea but that the footage was confiscated by the Indonesian government.

An epilogue shows pictures of newspaper headlines where it is revealed that Okuzaki attempted to kill Koshimizu, whom he holds responsible for the deaths of the two soldiers. Not finding him at home Okuzaki settled for shooting Koshimizu's son, who was seriously wounded. It is then stated that Okuzaki was sentenced to 12 years of hard labor for attempted murder.

Awards
 Berlin International Film Festival (1987)
 Caligari Film Award (Kazuo Hara)
 Blue Ribbon Awards (1988)
 Best Director (Kazuo Hara)
 Kinema Junpo Awards (1988)
 Readers' Choice Award for Best Film (Kazuo Hara)
 Mainichi Film Concours (1988)
 Best Director (Kazuo Hara)
 Best Sound Recording (Toyohiko Kuribayashi)
 Rotterdam International Film Festival (1988)
 KNF Award (Kazuo Hara)
 Yokohama Film Festival (1988)
 Best Director (Kazuo Hara)
 Best Film

See also

Notes

External links
 
 The Emperor's Naked Army Marches On: Review at Midnight Eye
 

1987 films
1987 documentary films
Japanese documentary films
1980s Japanese-language films
Films directed by Kazuo Hara
Documentary films about World War II
Documentary films about veterans
Films set in Kobe
Documentary films about Japanese war crimes
1980s Japanese films
Documentary films about anarchism